(James) Roy Taylor (born 1949)  is Professor of Ultrafast Physics and Technology at Imperial College London.

Education 
Larne Grammar School.
Taylor was educated at Queen's University Belfast where he was awarded a Bachelor of Science degree in Physics in 1971 followed by a PhD in laser physics in 1974 for research supervised by Daniel Joseph Bradley.

Research and career 
Taylor is widely acknowledged for his influential basic research on and development of diverse lasers systems and their application. He has contributed extensively to advances in picosecond and femtosecond dye laser technology, compact diode-laser and fibre-laser-pumped vibronic lasers and their wide-ranging application to fundamental studies, such as time resolved photophysics of resonant energy transfer and relaxation pathways of biological probes and organic field-effect transistors.

Taylor is particularly noted for his fundamental studies of ultrafast nonlinear optics in fibres, with emphasis on solitons, their amplification, the role of noise and self-effects, such as Raman gain. Through his integration of seeded, high-power fibre amplifiers and passive fibre he has demonstrated far-reaching versatility in pulse duration, repetition rate and spectral coverage. He contributed extensively to the development of high power supercontinuum or “white light” sources, which have been a scientific and commercial success.

Awards and honours 
Taylor's work has been recognized by the Ernst Abbe Award of the Carl Zeiss Foundation in 1990, the Young Medal and Prize of the Institute of Physics (IOP) in 2007, the Rumford Medal from the Royal Society in 2012 and the Faraday Medal and Prize of the Institute of Physics in 2019.

He was elected a Fellow of the Royal Society (FRS) in 2017.

References 

Physicists from Northern Ireland
Fellows of the Royal Society
Academics of Imperial College London
Alumni of Queen's University Belfast
Living people
1949 births